Władysław Ślebodziński (February 6, 1884 – January 3, 1972) was a Polish mathematician.

Władysław Ślebodziński was born in Pysznica, Poland and educated at the Jagiellonian University in Kraków (1903-1908) where he subsequently held a teaching position until 1921. After 1921, he lectured at the State High School of Mechanical Engineering Poznań and in the thirties, he was a visiting lecturer at the Poznań University and Warsaw University until 1939. During the Second World War, he gave underground lectures, leading to his imprisonment. He survived three German concentration camps: Auschwitz (1942 - 1945), where he gave underground university-level lectures as prisoner no. 79053, Gross-Rosen and Nordhausen. 

In 1945 he became a joint professor at Wrocław University and at the Wrocław University of Technology, and from 1951 he was a professor at the Wrocław University of Technology. With Bronisław Knaster, Edward Marczewski and Hugo Steinhaus, he was a co-founder of the mathematical journal Colloquium Mathematicum.

From 1949 until 1960, he was a Professor of the Institute of Mathematics of the Polish Academy of Sciences.

Władysław Ślebodziński's main interest was differential geometry. In 1931, he introduced the definition of the Lie derivative, although according to J.A. Schouten, the term Lie derivative occurred first in a two-part paper by van Dantzig.
He was the advisor of 11 PhD theses. He was also doctor honoris causa at the Wrocław University of Technology (1965), at the Poznań University of Technology (1967), and at the Wrocław University (1970). Prof. Ślebodziński was a member, President (1961-1963) and honorary member of the Polish Mathematical Society.

He died in Wrocław in 1972 and is buried in the Wrocław, Cemetery Sępolno.

See also
 Kraków School of Mathematics

Notes

References
  Classical approach using coordinates.

1884 births
1972 deaths
20th-century Polish mathematicians
Mittelbau-Dora concentration camp survivors
Auschwitz concentration camp survivors
Gross-Rosen concentration camp survivors
Jagiellonian University alumni
Academic staff of Adam Mickiewicz University in Poznań
Academic staff of the University of Wrocław